Inga martinicensis is a species of plant in the family Fabaceae. It is found only in Martinique.

References

martinicensis
Flora of Martinique
Vulnerable plants
Taxonomy articles created by Polbot